1921 in philosophy

Events

Publications 
 Theodor Lessing, Die verfluchte Kultur (published in German, 1921)
 Albert Einstein, The Meaning of Relativity (1921)
 Nicolai Hartmann, Grundzüge einer Metaphysik der Erkenntnis (published in German, 1921)
 Franz Rosenzweig, The Star of Redemption (1921)
 Ludwig Wittgenstein, Tractatus Logico-Philosophicus (First published in German in 1921 as Logisch-Philosophische Abhandlung; translated by C. K. Ogden with assistance from G. E. Moore, F. P. Ramsey, and Wittgenstein himself. G. E. Moore suggested the Latin title to pay homage to Tractatus Theologico-Politicus by Benedictus Spinoza. This book allegedly aimed to complete logical atomism as espoused by Bertrand Russell and G. E. Moore.)
 Liang Shuming, The Civilization and Philosophy of the East and the West (1921)

Births 
 February 4 - Betty Friedan (died 2006)
 February 8 - Hans Albert 
 February 21 - John Rawls (died 2002)
 May 12 - Joseph Beuys (died 1986)
 July 25 - Paul Watzlawick (died 2007)
 August 31 - Raymond Williams (died 1988)
 September 12 - Stanisław Lem (died 2006)
 September 19 - Paulo Freire (died 1997)

Deaths 
 February 8 - Peter Kropotkin (born 1842)

References 

Philosophy
20th-century philosophy
Philosophy by year